The American Football Association Challenge Cup (also known as the American Association Cup or simply American Cup) was the first major U.S. soccer competition open to teams beyond a single league.  It was first held in 1884.  In the 1910s, it gradually declined in importance with the establishment of the National Challenge Cup.  It was last held in 1924.
The trophy was made by Tiffany & Co. and is described as "a very elegant sterling silver trophy. It is a vase about thirteen inches high surmounted by a Roman athlete. On either side is a foot ball and goal post, while in front on a large shield is the inscription".

History

Founded in 1884, the American Football Association (AFA) was the first non-league organizing body in the United States.  Allied with the Football Association, the AFA sought to standardize rules for teams competing in northern New Jersey and southern New York.  Within two years, this region began to widen to include teams in Pennsylvania and Massachusetts.  Within a year of its founding, the AFA organized the first non-league cup in U.S. soccer history.  Teams from New Jersey and Massachusetts dominated the first twelve years.  Then in 1897, Philadelphia Manz brought the title to Pennsylvania for the first time.  Soccer in the United States went through a downturn in the late 1890s.

As a result, the AFA suspended the cup from 1899 until 1906.  By that time, the growth in the sport had led to a confusion of rules and standards.  This led to a movement to create a truly national body to oversee U.S. soccer.  Drawing on both its position as the oldest soccer organization and the status of the American Cup, the AFA argued that it should be the nationally recognized body.  In October 1911, a competing body, the American Amateur Football Association (AAFA) was created. It quickly spread outside the northeast U.S. and began its own cup in 1912, the American Amateur Football Association Cup.

That year, both the AFA and AAFA applied for membership in FIFA, the international organizing body for soccer. In 1913, the AAFA gained an edge over the AFA when several AFA organizations moved to the AAFA.  On April 5, 1913, the AAFA reorganized as the United States Football Association. FIFA quickly granted a provisional membership and USFA began exerting its influence on the sport.  This led to the establishment of the National Challenge Cup that fall.  The National Challenge Cup quickly grew to overshadow the American Cup.  However, both cups were played simultaneously for the next ten years.  Declining respect for the AFA led to the withdrawal of several associations from its cup in 1917.  Further competition came in 1922 when USFA created the National Amateur Cup.  That spelled the death knell for the American Cup.  It played its last season in 1924.

List of champions

References

External links
 Annual results

 
Defunct soccer competitions in the United States
Soccer cup competitions in the United States